Ahmad Jamal (born Frederick Russell Jones, July 2, 1930) is an American jazz pianist, composer, bandleader and educator. For six decades, he has been one of the most successful small-group leaders in jazz.

Biography

Early life
Jamal was born Frederick Russell Jones in Pittsburgh, Pennsylvania, on July 2, 1930. He began playing piano at the age of three, when his uncle Lawrence challenged him to duplicate what he was doing on the piano. Jamal began formal piano training at the age of seven with Mary Cardwell Dawson, whom he describes as greatly influencing him. His Pittsburgh roots have remained an important part of his identity ("Pittsburgh meant everything to me and it still does," he said in 2001) and it was there that he was immersed in the influence of jazz artists such as Earl Hines, Billy Strayhorn, Mary Lou Williams, and Erroll Garner. Jamal also studied with pianist James Miller and began playing piano professionally at the age of fourteen, at which point he was recognized as a "coming great" by the pianist Art Tatum. When asked about his practice habits by a critic from The New York Times, Jamal commented that, "I used to practice and practice with the door open, hoping someone would come by and discover me. I was never the practitioner in the sense of twelve hours a day, but I always thought about music. I think about music all the time."

Beginnings

Jamal began touring with George Hudson's Orchestra after graduating from George Westinghouse High School in 1948. He joined another touring group known as The Four Strings, which disbanded when violinist Joe Kennedy Jr. left. In 1950 he moved to Chicago and performed intermittently with local musicians Von Freeman and Claude McLin,  and solo at the Palm Tavern, occasionally joined by drummer Ike Day.

Born to Baptist parents, Jamal discovered Islam in his early 20s. While touring in Detroit, where there was a sizable Muslim community in the 1940s and 1950s, he became interested in Islam and Islamic culture. He converted to Islam and changed his name to Ahmad Jamal in 1950. In an interview with The New York Times a few years later, he said his decision to change his name stemmed from a desire to "re-establish my original name." Shortly after his conversion to Islam, he explained to The New York Times that he "says Muslim prayers five times a day and arises in time to say his first prayers at 5 am. He says them in Arabic in keeping with the Muslim tradition."

He made his first records in 1951 for the Okeh label with The Three Strings (which would later also be called the Ahmad Jamal Trio, although Jamal himself prefers not to use the term "trio"): the other members were guitarist Ray Crawford and a bassist, at different times Eddie Calhoun (1950–52), Richard Davis (1953–54), and Israel Crosby (from 1954). The Three Strings arranged an extended engagement at Chicago's Blue Note, but leapt to fame after performing at the Embers in New York City where John Hammond saw the band play and signed them to Okeh Records. Hammond, a record producer who discovered the talents and enhanced the fame of musicians like Benny Goodman, Billie Holiday, and Count Basie, also helped Jamal's trio attract critical acclaim. Jamal subsequently recorded for Parrot (1953–55) and Epic (1955) using the piano-guitar-bass lineup.

At the Pershing: But Not For Me

The trio's sound changed significantly when Crawford was replaced with drummer Vernel Fournier in 1957, and the group worked as the "House Trio" at Chicago's Pershing Hotel. The trio released the live album, At the Pershing: But Not for Me, which stayed on the Ten Best-selling charts for 108 weeks. Jamal's recording of the well known song "Poinciana" was first released on this album.

Perhaps Jamal's most famous recording, At the Pershing, was recorded at the Pershing Hotel in Chicago in 1958; it brought him popularity in the late 1950s and into the 1960s jazz age. Jamal played the set with bassist Israel Crosby and drummer Vernel Fournier. The set list expressed a diverse collection of tunes, including "The Surrey with the Fringe on Top" from the musical Oklahoma! and Jamal's arrangement of the jazz standard "Poinciana". Jazz musicians and listeners alike found inspiration in the At the Pershing recording, and Jamal's trio was recognized as an integral new building block in the history of jazz. Evident were his unusually minimalist style and his extended vamps, according to reviewer John Morthland. "If you're looking for an argument that pleasurable mainstream art can assume radical status at the same time, Jamal is your guide," said The New York Times contributor Ben Ratliff in a review of the album.

After the recording of the best-selling album But Not For Me, Jamal's music grew in popularity throughout the 1950s, and he attracted media coverage for his investment decisions pertaining to his "rising fortune". In 1959, he took a tour of North Africa to explore investment options in Africa. Jamal, who was 29 at the time, said he had a curiosity about the homeland of his ancestors, highly influenced by his conversion to the Muslim faith. He also said his religion had brought him peace of mind about his race, which accounted for his "growth in the field of music that has proved very lucrative for me." Upon his return to the U.S. after a tour of North Africa, the financial success of Live at the Pershing: But Not For Me allowed Jamal to open a restaurant and club called The Alhambra in Chicago. In 1962, The Three Strings disbanded and Jamal moved to New York City, where, at the age of 32, he took a three-year hiatus from his musical career.

Return to music and The Awakening 
In 1964, Jamal resumed touring and recording, this time with the bassist Jamil Nasser and recorded a new album, Extensions, in 1965. Jamal and Nasser continued to play and record together from 1964 to 1972. He also joined forces with Fournier (again, but only for about a year) and drummer Frank Gant (1966–76), among others. Until 1970, he played acoustic piano exclusively. The final album on which he played acoustic piano in the regular sequence was The Awakening. In the 1970s, he played electric piano as well; one such recording was an instrumental recording of "Suicide is Painless," the theme song from the 1970 film MASH, which was released on a 1973 reissue of the film's soundtrack album, replacing the original vocal version of the song by The Mash. It was rumored that the Rhodes piano was a gift from someone in Switzerland. He continued to play throughout the 1970s and 1980s, mostly in trios with piano, bass and drums, but he occasionally expanded the group to include guitar. One of his most long-standing gigs was as the band for the New Year's Eve celebrations at Blues Alley in Washington, D.C., from 1979 through the 1990s.

Later career 
In 1986, Jamal sued critic Leonard Feather for using his former name in a publication.

Clint Eastwood featured two recordings from Jamal's But Not For Me album — "Music, Music, Music" and "Poinciana" — in the 1995 movie The Bridges of Madison County.

In his eighties, Jamal continued to make numerous tours and recordings, including albums such as Saturday Morning (2013), the CD/DVD release Ahmad Jamal Featuring Yusef Lateef Live at L'Olympia (2014), and Marseille (2017), which features vocals in French.

Jamal is the main mentor of jazz piano virtuosa Hiromi Uehara, known as Hiromi.

Style and influence

Trained in both traditional jazz ("American classical music", as he prefers to call it) and European classical style, Ahmad Jamal has been praised as one of the greatest jazz innovators over his exceptionally long career. Following bebop greats like Charlie Parker and Dizzy Gillespie, Jamal entered the world of jazz at a time when speed and virtuosic improvisation were central to the success of jazz musicians as artists. Jamal, however, took steps in the direction of a new movement, later coined "cool jazz" – an effort to move jazz in the direction of popular music. He emphasized space and time in his musical compositions and interpretations instead of focusing on the blinding speed of bebop.

Because of this style, Jamal was "often dismissed by jazz writers as no more than a cocktail pianist, a player so given to fluff that his work shouldn't be considered seriously in any artistic sense". Stanley Crouch, author of Considering Genius, offers a very different reaction to Jamal's music, claiming that, like the highly influential Thelonious Monk, Jamal was a true innovator of the jazz tradition and is second in importance in the development of jazz after 1945 only to Parker. His unique musical style stemmed from many individual characteristics, including his use of orchestral effects and his ability to control the beat of songs. These stylistic choices resulted in a unique and new sound for the piano trio: "Through the use of space and changes of rhythm and tempo", writes Crouch, "Jamal invented a group sound that had all the surprise and dynamic variation of an imaginatively ordered big band." Jamal explored the texture of riffs, timbres, and phrases rather than the quantity or speed of notes in any given improvisation. Speaking about Jamal, A. B. Spellman of the National Endowment of the Arts said: "Nobody except Thelonious Monk used space better, and nobody ever applied the artistic device of tension and release better." These (at the time) unconventional techniques that Jamal gleaned from both traditional classical and contemporary jazz musicians helped pave the way for later jazz greats like Bill Evans, Herbie Hancock, and McCoy Tyner.

Though Jamal is often overlooked by jazz critics and historians, he is frequently credited with having a great influence on Miles Davis. Davis is quoted as saying that he was impressed by Jamal's rhythmic sense and his "concept of space, his lightness of touch, his understatement". Jamal characterizes what he thought Davis admired about his music as: "my discipline as opposed to my space." Jamal and Davis became friends in the 1950s, and Davis continued to support Jamal as a fellow musician, often playing versions of Jamal's own songs ("Ahmad's Blues", "New Rhumba") until he died in 1991.

Jamal, speaking about his own work, says, "I like doing ballads. They're hard to play. It takes years of living, really, to read them properly." From an early age, Jamal developed an appreciation for the lyrics of the songs he learned: "I once heard Ben Webster playing his heart out on a ballad. All of a sudden he stopped. I asked him, 'Why did you stop, Ben?' He said, 'I forgot the lyrics.'" Jamal attributes the variety in his musical taste to the fact that he grew up in several eras: the big band era, the bebop years, and the electronic age. He says his style evolved from drawing on the techniques and music produced in these three eras. In 1985, Jamal agreed to do an interview and recording session with his fellow jazz pianist, Marian McPartland on her NPR show Piano Jazz. Jamal, who said he rarely plays "But Not For Me" due to its popularity since his 1958 recording, played an improvised version of the tune – though only after noting that he has moved on to making ninety percent of his repertoire his own compositions. He said that when he grew in popularity from the Live at the Pershing album, he was severely criticized afterwards for not playing any of his own compositions.

In more recent years, Jamal has embraced the electronic influences affecting the genre of jazz. He has also occasionally expanded his usual small ensemble of three to include a tenor saxophone (George Coleman) and a violin. A jazz fan interviewed by Down Beat magazine about Jamal in 2010 described his development as "more aggressive and improvisational these days. The word I used to use is avant garde; that might not be right. Whatever you call it, the way he plays is the essence of what jazz is."

Saxophonist Ted Nash described his experience with Jamal's style in an interview with Down Beat magazine: "The way he comped wasn't the generic way that lots of pianists play with chords in the middle of the keyboard, just filling things up. He gave lots of single line responses. He'd come back and throw things out at you, directly from what you played. It was really interesting because it made you stop, and allowed him to respond, and then you felt like playing something else – that's something I don't feel with a lot of piano players. It's really quite engaging. I guess that's another reason people focus in on him. He makes them hone in [sic]."

Jamal has recorded with the voices of the Howard A. Roberts Chorale on The Bright, the Blue and the Beautiful and Cry Young; with vibraphonist Gary Burton on In Concert; with brass, reeds, and strings celebrating his hometown of Pittsburgh; with The Assai Quartet; and with saxophonist George Coleman on the album The Essence.

Awards and honors
 1959: Entertainment Award, Pittsburgh Junior Chamber of Commerce
 1980: Distinguished Service Award, City of Washington D.C., Anacostia Neighborhood Museum, Smithsonian Institution
 1981: Nomination, Best R&B Instrumental Performance ("You're Welcome", "Stop on By"), NARAS
 1986: Mellon Jazz Festival Salutes Ahmad Jamal, Pittsburgh, Pennsylvania
 1987: Honorary Membership, Philippines Jazz Foundation
 1994: American Jazz Masters award, National Endowment for the Arts
 2001: Arts & Culture Recognition Award, National Coalition of 100 Black Women
 2001: Kelly-Strayhorn Gallery of Stars, for Achievements as Pianist and Composer, East Liberty Quarter Chamber of Commerce
 2003: American Jazz Hall of Fame, New Jersey Jazz Society
 2003: Gold Medallion, Steinway & Sons 150 Years Celebration (1853–2003)
 2007: Living Jazz Legend, Kennedy Center for the Performing Arts
 2007: Ordre des Arts et des Lettres, French government
 2011: Down Beat Hall of Fame, 76th Readers Poll
 2015: Honorary Doctorate of Music, The New England Conservatory
 2017: Grammy Lifetime Achievement Award, The Recording Academy
 2018: Leopolis Jazz Music Awards Leopolis Jazz Fest, Lviv

Discography

As leader

Compilations 
1967: Standard Eyes (Cadet)
1972: Inspiration (Cadet)
1974: Re-evaluations: The Impulse! Years (Impulse!)
1980: The Best of Ahmad Jamal (20th Century)
1998: Ahmad Jamal 1956–66 Recordings
1998: Cross Country Tour 1958–1961 (GRP/Chess)
2005: The Legendary Okeh & Epic Recordings (1951–1955) (Columbia Legacy)
2007: Complete Live at the Pershing Lounge 1958 (Gambit)
2007: Complete Live at the Spotlite Club 1958 (Gambit)
2014: Complete Live at the Blackhawk (Essential Jazz Classics)

As sideman 
With Ray Brown
 Some of My Best Friends Are...The Piano Players (Telarc, 1994)

With Shirley Horn
 May the Music Never End (Verve, 2003)

Notes

References
 "Ahmad Jamal: 'Ahmad Jamal at the Pershing: But Not For Me'". Basic Jazz Record Library. NPR. August 1, 2001. Radio.
 "Ahmad Jamal On Piano Jazz 1985." Piano Jazz. NPR. August 29, 2008. Radio.
 Crouch, Stanley. Considering Genius: Writings on Jazz. Cambridge: Basic Civitas Books, 2006. Print.
 Early, Gerald (ed.). Miles Davis and American Culture. St. Louis: Missouri Historical Society Press, 2001. Print.
 Holsey, Steve. "Sepia on the Record". Sepia (Fort Worth, TX), April 1, 1980: 14. Print.
 "Jamal, Ahmad – Ahmad's Blues." Colin Larkin (ed.), Encyclopedia of Music, 4th edition. Oxford Music Online. Web. April 17, 2012.
 "Jamal, Ahmad." Colin Larkin (ed.), Encyclopedia of Popular Music, 4th edition. Oxford Music Online. Web. April 17, 2012.
 Macnie, Jim. "Intricacy & Groove: At Home with Ahmad Jamal". Downbeat, March 2010, Vol. 77, Issue 3: 26–31. Microfilm.
 Norris, Michele. "1,000 Essential Recordings You Must Hear". All Things Considered. By Tom Moon. August 22, 2008. Radio.
 Walz, Jay. "Pianist-Investor Is A Hit in Cairo: Jazz Musician Ahmad Jamal Finds Moslem Faith Aids Him on African Visit". The New York Times, November 20, 1959: 14. Print.
 Waltzer, Ben. "Always Making Jazz Seem New: The Pianist Ahmad Jamal is an Innovator Who Finds Originality by Taking a Long at the Tradition of Small-Group Jazz". The New York Times, November 11, 2001: A27. Print 
 Wang, Richard and Barry Kernfeld. "Jamal, Ahmad". Barry Kernfeld (ed.), The New Grove Dictionary of Jazz, 2nd edition. Grove Music Online. Oxford Music Online. Web. April 17, 2012.
 Wright, Todd and John Higby. "Appalachian Jazz: Some Preliminary Notes". Black Music Research Journal 23, 1/2 (2003): 58, 59. Print.

External links 

 Official site
 A Fireside Chat with Ahmad Jamal
 "Poinciana" Turns Fifty" by Ted Gioia (www.jazz.com)
 Ahmad Jamal at NPR
 
 

1930 births
African-American pianists
African-American Muslims
American jazz pianists
American male pianists
Argo Records artists
Atlantic Records artists
Cadet Records artists
Converts to Islam
Cool jazz pianists
Impulse! Records artists
American jazz composers
American male jazz composers
Living people
Musicians from Pittsburgh
Verve Records artists
Grammy Lifetime Achievement Award winners
20th-century American pianists
Jazz musicians from Pennsylvania
21st-century American pianists
20th-century American male musicians
21st-century American male musicians
20th-century African-American musicians
21st-century African-American musicians
American Ahmadis
African-American jazz pianists
Okeh Records artists
Parrot Records artists
Epic Records artists
Telarc Records artists
ABC Records artists